Crenicichla tingui is a species of cichlid native to South America, found in Brazil.

References

Kullander, S.O. and C.A.S. Lucena, 2006. A review of the species of Crenicichla (Teleostei: Cichlidae) from the Atlantic coastal rivers of southeastern Brazil from Bahia to Rio Grande do Sul States, with descriptions of three new species. Neotrop. Ichthyol. 4(2):127-146.

tingui
Freshwater fish of Brazil
Taxa named by Carlos Alberto Santos de Lucena
Taxa named by Sven O. Kullander
Fish described in 2006